A bird nest is a place where birds lay and hatch eggs.

Bird's nest may also refer to:

Places
Nickname for the Beijing National Stadium
The Bird's Nest (house), Newport, Rhode Island
Bird's Nest (Shelby County, Kentucky)

Cuisine
Bird's nest soup, a delicacy made from the salivary excretions of the swiftlet
Seafood birdsnest, southern Chinese dish made of taro
Another name for egg in the basket

Plants and fungi
Bird's nest plant, carrot (Daucus carota)
Bird's nest fern, several species of ferns in the genus Asplenium
Bird's nest orchid, Neottia nidus-avis
Bird's nest fungi, several fungi in the order Nidulariales

Books
The Bird's Nest (novel), by Shirley Jackson

Other
Birds Nest (horse), a British Thoroughbred racehorse